Peter Larsen (4 March 1904 – 13 November 1985) was a Danish wrestler. He competed in the men's Greco-Roman heavyweight at the 1936 Summer Olympics.

References

External links
 

1904 births
1985 deaths
Danish male sport wrestlers
Olympic wrestlers of Denmark
Wrestlers at the 1936 Summer Olympics